Brenda Shanahan may refer to:

Brenda Shanahan (businesswoman), Irish businesswoman
Brenda Shanahan (politician), Canadian politician